Vladica Brdarovski (born 7 February 1990 in Bitola) is a Macedonian footballer who currently plays for Shkupi.

Club career
Brdarovski began his career with his home town club FK Pelister before he joined Rabotnički in January 2011. The same month he received the award for Best young player of the first half-season in 2010–11 by the internet portal MacedonianFootball.com.

Brdarovski made a comeback to his first club FK Pelister on 1 August 2013.

International career 
He made his senior debut for North Macedonia in a December 2012 friendly match against Poland and has earned a total of 7 caps, scoring no goals. His final international was a November 2015 friendly match against Lebanon.

References

External links
 

 Profile at Macedonian Football
Interview with Vladica Brdarovski

1990 births
Living people
Sportspeople from Bitola
Association football fullbacks
Macedonian footballers
North Macedonia international footballers
FK Pelister players
FC Zbrojovka Brno players
FK Rabotnički players
Győri ETO FC players
FK Vardar players
Macedonian First Football League players
Czech First League players
Nemzeti Bajnokság I players
Macedonian expatriate footballers
Expatriate footballers in the Czech Republic
Macedonian expatriate sportspeople in the Czech Republic
Expatriate footballers in Hungary
Macedonian expatriate sportspeople in Hungary